Jamadar Kisku is an Indian, Santali writer from West Bengal. He won the Sahitya Akademi Award in 2014.

Biography
Kisku was born in 1949. He writes, acts and directs plays in Santali at Kherwal Opera, Kolkata. He is also the editor of Tapal, a Santali literary magazine. He lives in Hooghly, West Bengal.

Kisku was awarded the Sahitya Akademi Award in 2014 for his play Mala Mudam.

References

Living people
1949 births
People from Hooghly district
Recipients of the Sahitya Akademi Award in Santali
Santali people